Barwadda is an inhabited place in Govindpur CD block in Dhanbad Sadar subdivision of Dhanbad district in the Indian state of Jharkhand.

Geography

Location

Barwaada has not been identified as a separate place in 2011 census. As per map of Govindpur CD Block on page 121 in  District Census Handbook, Dhanbad it appears to be a part of Damkarabarwa mouza.

Dhanbad Airport is located in Barwaada.

Note: The map alongside presents some of the notable locations in the area. All places marked in the map are linked in the larger full screen map.

Overview
The region shown in the map lies to the north of Dhanbad city and is an extensive rural area with villages (particularly in the northern areas) scattered around hills. One of the many spurs of Pareshnath Hill (1,365.50 m), situated in neighbouring Giridih district, passes through the Topchanchi and Tundi areas of the district. The Barakar River flows along the northern boundary. The region shown in the map covers several CD blocks – Topchanchi, Govindpur, Tundi, Purbi Tundi and a small part of Baghmara. The Kolkata-Agra National Highway 19 (old number NH 2)/ Grand Trunk Road cuts across the southern part of the region.

Police station
There is a police station at Barwaada.

Transport
Barwaada Bypass Road links Barwaada to National Highway 19 (old number NH 2)/ Grand Trunk Road.

References

Villages in Dhanbad district